The Gold Market ( Souk ad-Dahab; also known as the Qissariya Market,  Souk al-Qissariya) is a narrow covered passageway located in the old quarter of Gaza; it is both a center for trading and buying gold, and location for foreign exchange.  The Market lies along the southern edge of the Great Mosque of Gaza, beside the main Omar Mukhtar Street.  The Market is configured with a pointed and vaulted roof above the central road, which is lined on both sides by small shops that are themselves roofed by the cross vaults of the covered central road.

History
Gazan judge Sheikh Shams ad-Din al-Himsi ordered the construction of the Gold Market in 1476 CE, under Mamluk rule in Palestine.  The Market originally formed a part of a much larger covered market, but most of the area was destroyed by the British Army during World War I.

Throughout most of the 20th and 21st centuries, the market was visited mostly by men and women engaged to be married, to pick out gold jewellery, and by mothers-in-law to purchase gifts for their daughters-in-law.  However, because of food shortages arising in Gaza from the Israeli blockade of the Gaza Strip, the Gold Market presently is used chiefly by elderly Gazans selling family heirlooms to raise cash.

References

Bibliography

Buildings and structures in Gaza City
Mamluk architecture in the State of Palestine
Souqs
Gold